Eggbeare is a hamlet  north-east of Launceston in east Cornwall, England.

References

Hamlets in Cornwall